Oakland Plantation, also known as Lloyd Farm and the Elks Lodge, is a historic plantation house located at Tarboro, Edgecombe County, North Carolina. The frame dwelling dates to the mid-19th century, and consists of a two-story central section with flanking one-story wings and a series of rear additions. It has shallow hip roofs with Italianate brackets and features a one-story porch of the distinctive Tarboro lattice type.  By 1931, the dwelling was occupied as an Elks Lodge for the African-American population.

It was listed on the National Register of Historic Places in 1976.

References

Plantation houses in North Carolina
African-American history of North Carolina
Houses on the National Register of Historic Places in North Carolina
Italianate architecture in North Carolina
Houses in Edgecombe County, North Carolina
National Register of Historic Places in Edgecombe County, North Carolina